SS Sirsa was a steamship built at A. & J. Inglis in 1883 and owned by the British India Steam Navigation Company.

Fate 

She was sold for scrapping on 21 August 1908 and broken up at Bombay.

References 

Steamships of the United Kingdom
Ships of the British India Steam Navigation Company
1883 ships